Maurice Vaïsse (born 7 May 1942 in Algiers) is a French historian specialised in international relations and Defence. He is an Editorial Board member on Journal of Intelligence and Terrorism Studies.

Biography
Vaïsse graduated with a History Agrégation in 1967. He has been a professor of contemporary history at Reims university, and is now a professor at the Institut d'études politiques de Paris, where he teaches history of international relations. Since 2008, he has headed the scientific council for historical research at the Ministry of Defence.

Vaïsse is a member of the Commission of diplomatic archives, and heads the Commission de publication des documents diplomatiques français, tasked with the publication of diplomatic notes.

From 1981 to 1995, he has headed the Association pour la recherche sur la paix et la guerre (Arpege). From 1985 to 1986, he was an auditor at the Institut des hautes études de la défense nationale. From 1986 to 2000, he headed the Groupe d'études français d'histoire de l'armement nucléaire (French study group for history of nuclear weapons). He presided the Centre d'études d'histoire de la défense (Centre for studies of Defence History), and has been a technical counsellor to the Charles De Gaulle Foundation between 1995 and 2001.

Vaïsse has, furthermore, sat on numerous peer committees, notably for Relations Internationales, Politique étrangère, Défense nationale, Cold War History Review, and the Retour aux textes collection of la Documentation française. Since 1991, he has co-directed the Revue d'histoire diplomatique, and since 1996, the Histoires collection of Bruylant Editors.

Vaïsse sits on the administration council of Liberté pour l'histoire.

Vaïsse is the father of Justin Vaïsse, who also is a preeminent historian.

Honours
Knight of the legion of Honour (1994) 
Officer of the Ordre national du Mérite (2000) 
Doctor honoris causa from Oradea University (Romania, 2002) 
Prize of the Académie des Sciences Morales et Politiques for Diplomatie et outil militaire, 1992
Prize of the Institut de France for Sécurité d'abord, 1981
Member of the Franco-British Council

Works

Foreign policy manuals 
 Diplomatie et outil militaire (1871–1991), Éditions du Seuil, Paris, 1992
 Les Relations internationales depuis 1945, Armand Colin, Paris, 10e édition, 2005

Other works
 Sécurité d’abord. La politique française en matière de désarmement (9 décembre 1930 – 17 avril 1934), Pédone, Paris, 1981
 Alger, le putsch (1961), Complexe, Bruxelles, 1983
 Ardenne 1940, Veyrier, Paris, 1991
 L’Europe et la Crise de Cuba, Armand Colin, Paris, 1993
 Le Pacifisme en Europe des années 1920 aux années 1950, Bruylant, Bruxelles, 1993
 La France et l’Atome. Études d’histoire nucléaire, Bruylant, Bruxelles, 1994
 La Politique spatiale de la France dans le contexte international, Édition des Archives contemporaines, Paris, 1997
 La France et l’Opération de Suez de 1956. Actes d’une table ronde, ADDIM, Paris, 1997
 Aux armes citoyens ! Conscription et armée de métier, des Grecs à nos jours, Armand Colin, Paris, 1998
 « Il n’est point de secrets que le temps ne révèle. » Études sur l’histoire du renseignement, Lavauzelle, Panazol, 1998
 La Grandeur. Politique étrangère du général de Gaulle (1958–1969), Fayard, Paris, 1998
 Vers la paix en Algérie. Les négociations d’Évian dans les archives diplomatiques françaises, Bruylant, Bruxelles, 2003
 La Paix au XXe siècle, Paris, Belin, 2004
 La Puissance ou l'Influence ?, Paris, Fayard, 2009

Other works, as co-author
 Lexique historique des États-Unis au XXe siècle, avec Denise Artaud, Paris, Armand Colin, 1978
 La Champagne et ses administrations à travers le temps, La Manufacture, Paris, 1990
 L’Énergie nucléaire en Europe des origines à Euratom. Actes des journées d’études de Louvain-la-Neuve des 18 et 19 November 1991, Lang, Berne, 1994
  Diplomatie et outil militaire (1871–1991), avec Jean Doise, Éditions du Seuil, Paris, 1992
 8 mai 1945 : la victoire en Europe. Actes du colloque international de Reims, 1985, Complexe, Bruxelles, 1994
 Dictionnaire des relations internationales au XXe siècle, avec Colette Barbier, Armand Colin, Paris, 2000
  Militaires et guérilla dans la guerre d’Algérie, avec Jean-Charles Jauffret, Complexe, Bruxelles, 2001
 Armement et Ve République (fin des années 1950 – fin des années 1960), Centre national de la recherche scientifique, Paris, 2002
 La Guerre au XXe siècle, avec Jean-Louis Dufour, Hachette, Paris, 2e édition, 2003
 La Guerre du Viet-Nam et l’Europe (1963–1973), avec Christopher Goscha, Bruylant, Paris, 2003
 L’Europe et la Crise de Cuba (colloque), avec Charles Cogan, Armand Colin, Paris, 2003
 L’Entente cordiale de Fachoda à la Grande Guerre. Dans les archives du Quai d’Orsay, Complexe, Bruxelles, 2004
Histoire de la diplomatie française, avec Jean-Claude Allain, Françoise Autrand, Lucien Bély, Philippe Contamine, Pierre Guillen, Thierry Lentz, Georges-Henri Soutou, Laurent Theis, 2005
 Dictionnaire des ministres des Affaires étrangères, co-direction avec Lucien Bély, Laurent Theis, Georges-Henri Soutou, préface de Michel Barnier, Fayard, Paris, 2005
 De Gaulle et la Russie, avec Philippe Oulmont et Létizia de Linarès, Centre national de la recherche scientifique, Paris, 2006
 Mai 68 vu de l'étranger : les événements dans les archives diplomatiques françaises, avec Colette Barbier, Victor Cassé, Thérèse Charmasson, Editions CNRS, Paris, 2008

Sources and references

21st-century French historians
Living people
1942 births
Writers from Algiers
Chevaliers of the Légion d'honneur
Officers of the Ordre national du Mérite
French male non-fiction writers
20th-century French historians